Alitta succinea (known as the pile worm or clam worm) is a species of marine annelid in the family Nereididae (commonly known as ragworms or sandworms). It has been recorded throughout the North West Atlantic, as well as in the Gulf of Maine and South Africa.

Description

It is brown colored at the rear, and reddish-brown on the rest of its body. It has an identifiable head with four eyes, two sensory feelers or palps, and many tentacles. The head consists of two segments: the anterior and posterior prostomium. The last body segment is known as the pygidium.

Life cycle
It is a freeswimming polychaete, scavenging on the bottom of shallow marine waters. It feeds on other worms and algae. To feed, it uses a proboscis, which has two hooks at the end, to grasp prey and draw it into its mouth. Clam worms are an important food source for bottom-feeding fish and crustaceans, though they can protect themselves by secreting a mucus substance that hardens to form a sheath around them.

During lunar phases in the spring and early summer, the clam worm undergoes epigamy. Their parapodia enlarge so they can swim. The clam worms are then capable of releasing eggs and sperm. Soon after they have released their eggs or sperm, they die.

Planktonic larvae develop, grow into adults and eventually sink to the bottom of the water.

Synonyms
Synonyms of Alitta succinea include:
Neanthes perrieri Saint-Joseph, 1898 (subjective synonym)
Neanthes succinea (Frey & Leuckart, 1847)
Nereis australis Treadwell, 1923 (subjective synonym)
Nereis saltoni Hartman, 1936 (subjective synonym)
Nereis succinea (Frey & Leuckart, 1847)
Nereis acutifolia Ehlers, 1901 (subjective synonym)
Nereis belawanensis Pflugfelder, 1933 (subjective synonym)
Nereis glandulosa Ehlers, 1908 (subjective synonym)
Nereis limbata Ehlers, 1868 (subjective synonym)
Nereis reibischi Heinen, 1911 (subjective synonym)
Nereis succinea Frey & Leuckart, 1847

Dispersal
A. succinea is dispersed outside of its native range in the course of oyster farming and fishing, on the oysters themselves, in ballast water, as hull fouling, on normal ocean currents, and possibly in sport fishing bait.

References

Further information

Phyllodocida
Animals described in 1847
Taxa named by Rudolf Leuckart